Segunda División B was the third tier of the Venezuelan football league system. 

The Venezuelan third division was established in 2005.

List of champions

Titles by Team

External links
 Resolución de la FVF

3
Sports leagues established in 2005
2005 establishments in Venezuela
Ven